"Bam" is a song by American hip hop artist Jay-Z from his thirteenth studio album, 4:44 (2017). The song samples Sister Nancy's "Bam Bam". It charted in the United States and United Kingdom in 2017.

Background
The song includes a sample of "Bam Bam" by Jamaican musician Sister Nancy, which fellow rapper Kanye West had previously sampled on his single "Famous". In response to Jay-Z sampling her work, Sister Nancy said: "It's a blessing."

Charts

Release history

References

2017 singles
2017 songs
Damian Marley songs
Jay-Z songs
Song recordings produced by No I.D.
Songs written by Jay-Z
Songs written by No I.D.
Songs written by Damian Marley